Choaspes xanthopogon, the similar awlking, is a species of butterfly belonging to the family Hesperiidae.

Range
The similar awlking is found in India along the Himalayas from Kashmir to Nepal, Sikkim and Assam, Myanmar, western China and possibly Borneo.

Status
William Harry Evans wrote that the taxon similis is rare. Taxon similis is a synonym for xanthopogon, see previous notes.

Cited references

See also
Coeliadinae
Hesperiidae
List of butterflies of India (Coeliadinae)
List of butterflies of India (Hesperiidae)

References
Print

Online

Brower, Andrew V. Z., (2007). Choaspes Moore 1881. Version 21 February 2007 (under construction). Page on genus Choaspes in The Tree of Life Web Project http://tolweb.org/.
.

Coeliadinae
Fauna of Pakistan
Butterflies of Asia
Butterflies described in 1844